The Incredibly Strange Film Show was a series of documentaries presented by Jonathan Ross focusing on the world of "psychotronic" or B movies.

Each episode was focused on the lives of filmmakers like Herschell Gordon Lewis, Sam Raimi, Doris Wishman, Ed Wood Jr, Jackie Chan and many other notable filmmakers who had their own unique style of filmmaking and have made contributions to the world of cinema. Various movie genres, including such outré types as Mexican wrestling and Hong Kong horror films, were also examined.

The series' first episode featured interviews filmed at the Senator Theater, in Baltimore, during the premiere of Hairspray, including an interview with John Waters and one of the last recorded interviews with Divine.

The show was originally aired on 5 August 1988 on Channel 4.  A second series, entitled Son of The Incredibly Strange Film Show, aired the following year. Both series aired in the US on the Discovery Channel in the early 1990s. The show was followed by Jonathan Ross Presents for One Week Only, which featured filmmakers including Alejandro Jodorowski and David Lynch.

Episodes

Season 1: The Incredibly Strange Film Show

Season 2: Son of The Incredibly Strange Film Show

Reception and legacy
Film studies academic Dean DeFino described the show as "highly regarded". The Baltimore Sun called it "strangely engaging".

Director Edgar Wright claimed that the episode on Sam Raimi inspired him to become a filmmaker.

Book
The Incredibly Strange Film Book, a spin-off written by Ross, was published in 1993.

References

External links

The Incredibly Strange Film Show at channelx.co.uk
Son Of Incredibly Strange Film Show at channelx.co.uk
The Incredibly Strange Film Show at thetvdb
IndieWire article about David Lynch episode

1988 British television series debuts
1989 British television series endings
Channel 4 documentary series
British documentary television series
Channel 4 original programming
1980s British documentary television series
Works about film